The 1992–93 Chicago Blackhawks season was the 67th season of operation of the Chicago Blackhawks in the National Hockey League.

Offseason

After reaching the Stanley Cup Finals, the Blackhawks did not stand pat and again made several moves.  The biggest move by Mike Keenan was to replace himself as Coach with his hand-picked successor, Darryl Sutter.  The other big offseason move was a bad trade of future Hall of Fame goalie Dominik Hasek to the Buffalo Sabres for Stephane Beauregard (who never played for the Hawks) and a fourth-round 1993 draft choice (which actually turned out to be Eric Daze).

Regular season

Over the regular season, the Blackhawks led the league in most shutouts for (9), fewest goals against (230) and fewest even-strength goals against (139). They also had the most power-play opportunities (510). Goaltender Ed Belfour led all goaltenders in games (71), shutouts (7) and minutes played (4,106).

Final standings

Schedule and results

Playoffs

The Hawks fell in the first round to St. Louis 4 games to 0. 

Game 1: 

St. Louis 4  Chicago 3

Game 2:

St. Louis 2 Chicago 0

Game 3:

Chicago 0  St. Louis 3

Game 4:

Chicago 3 St. Louis 4 (OT)

Player statistics

Awards and records
 Ed Belfour, Vezina Trophy

Transactions

Draft picks
Chicago's draft picks at the 1992 NHL Entry Draft held at the Montreal Forum in Montreal, Quebec.

Farm teams

See also
1992–93 NHL season

References

 

Chicago
Chicago
Chicago Blackhawks seasons
Norris Division champion seasons
Chic
Chic